The Stade Bauer (also called the Stade de Paris) is a 10,000-capacity football stadium in Saint-Ouen-sur-Seine in the northern suburbs of Paris. The stadium is mainly used by Red Star F.C. who currently play in Championnat National but have tasted success in the Coupe de France, winning it on five occasions (1921, 1922, 1923, 1928, 1942).

History 
It hosted some of the football events for the 1924 Summer Olympics. It also hosted a friendly game between Brazil and Andorra (3–0) right before the 1998 FIFA World Cup in France.

Stade de Paris was also the France national rugby league team's home ground for the 1935, 1936–37, 1938, and 1952–53 European Rugby League Championships.

In recent years the stadium has fallen into disrepair, having been damaged heavily by a storm in 1999, and also suffering from a lack of financial investment since.

In the 2016–2017 season, Red Star F.C. played its home matches at Stade Jean-Bouin as Stade Bauer did not meet the public safety requirements for a French second tier stadium. Since the team's demotion to the Championnat National, the third tier of French football, the club have resumed occupancy of their traditional home ground.

On 18 May 2021, the enclosure was sold by the city of Saint-Ouen-sur-Seine to Groupe Réalités for a makeover. Reconstruction work started and will allow the Bauer Stadium to be in line with sporting ambitions of the Red Star in case of promotion in Ligue 2.

References

External links 
1924 Summer Olympics official report. p. 321. 

Venues of the 1924 Summer Olympics
Olympic football venues
Football venues in France
Red Star F.C.
Sports venues completed in 1909
Sports venues in Seine-Saint-Denis
1909 establishments in France